Raffaele Chiulli (born January 22, 1957) is an Italian sports executive who is the president of the Global Association of International Sports Federations (GAISF), the umbrella organization for all (Olympic and non-Olympic) International Sports Federations, SportAccord, the Association of IOC Recognised International Sports Federations (ARISF) and the Union Internationale Motonautique (UIM), the International Power Boating Federation.

Early life and education
Chiulli was born in Rome, Italy. He earned a Doctor of Sciences with honors from the Sapienza University of Rome and undertook post-graduate education at Duke University, Institut Européen d'Administration des Affaires (INSEAD), and International Institute for Management Development (IMD) in Switzerland. He speaks Italian natively, as well as English, French and Spanish.

Administrative career
Chiulli is serving as president of the Union Internationale Motonautique (UIM), the International Power Boating Federation, since 2007. In 2020 he was part of an initiative, led by Alejandro Agag, to create the world's first electric boat racing series. Chiulli is also serving as president of the Association of IOC Recognised International Sports Federations (ARISF) since 2013, when he defeated Carlos Freitag of the World DanceSport Federation in an election.

Having served as vice-president of the Global Association of International Sports Federations (GAISF) since 2015 and senior vice-president since 2016, on May 18, 2019, Chiulli was elected as president of the organization. He announced the inaugural World Urban Games, held in 2019 in Budapest. Chiulli was also involved in restarting the World Combat Games in 2021.

References

1957 births
Living people
Italian sports executives and administrators